Adiemus may refer to:

Adiemus (albums), a series of albums of music composed by Karl Jenkins
Adiemus: Songs of Sanctuary, the first album of the series
"Adiemus" (song), the title track of the first album
Adiemus (ensemble), the group of Karl Jenkins, Mike Ratledge, and Miriam Stockley formed for Songs of Sanctuary